Philip William Dudley (born 17 February 1959) is a former English footballer who played as a right-back.

Career
Dudley began his career at Southend United, linking up with the first team in 1977 after time in the youth team. Dudley appeared 112 times in the Football League for Southend, before moving to Chelmsford City in July 1983. After a spell at Chelmsford, Dudley played for Basildon United, Heybridge Swifts, Haringey Borough, Bowers, Billericay Town and Southend Manor, before finishing his career with local Chelmsfordian clubs Ramsden, Great Baddow and Writtle.

References

1959 births
Living people
Association football defenders
English footballers
Sportspeople from Basildon
Southend United F.C. players
Chelmsford City F.C. players
Basildon United F.C. players
Heybridge Swifts F.C. players
Haringey Borough F.C. players
Bowers & Pitsea F.C. players
Billericay Town F.C. players
Southend Manor F.C. players
English Football League players